Karl Probst (20 October 1883 – 25 August 1963) was an American freelance engineer and automotive pioneer, credited with drafting the design drawings of the first prototype of the Bantam Reconnaissance Car, also known as the World War II "jeep" in 1940. He was born in Point Pleasant, West Virginia to Charles and Eva (Knight) Probst. He studied engineering at Ohio State University and graduated in 1906.

Probst was recruited by American Bantam Car Company in 1940 to help it win a contract to provide the U.S. Army with a lightweight reconnaissance vehicle that could transport troops and equipment across rugged terrain. Bantam had provided the specifications to the Army, and Probst drafted the design for the Jeep in two days, commencing on 17 June 1940, Bantam's first hand-built prototype was complete and running by September 21, 1940, just meeting the 49-day deadline and was delivered to the Army Quartermaster Corps for testing at Camp Holabird, MD.

He died in Dayton, Ohio.

Legacy
The Port Authority of Allegheny County pays homage to Karl Probst by putting his name on one or more of the city buses.

Around 1990, a crescent-shaped street in Caen (France) was named after Karl Probst, both extremities of which open on another street named after Commodore John Hughes-Hallett, in a district close to the Mémorial pour la Paix museum, where a majority of streets commemorate personalities linked with the Second World War, the Résistance, and the subsequent making of the European Community.

References 

 WQED Pittsburgh: Pittsburghers of the Century: December 1999:
 Bantam employees invented the Jeep
 Bantam jeep story
 Original WWII Jeep Photograph Archive
In August 2011, the VOA Special English service of the Voice of America broadcast a report on the Bantam Jeep as part of its American Mosaic series. A transcript and MP3 of the program, intended for English learners, can be found at The Jeep – One of the Most Famous Vehicles in the World – is Celebrated at its Birthplace.

People from Point Pleasant, West Virginia
1963 deaths
1883 births
People from Pittsburgh
Engineers from West Virginia
American automotive pioneers
20th-century American engineers
Engineers from Pennsylvania
Inventors from West Virginia